Lueheia is a genus of worms belonging to the family Plagiorhynchidae.

The species of this genus are found in Central America.

Species:

Lueheia adlueheia 
Lueheia cajabambensis 
Lueheia inscripta 
Lueheia karachiensis 
Lueheia lueheia

References

Plagiorhynchidae
Acanthocephala genera